Lycodon travancoricus, commonly known as the Travancore wolf snake, is a species of colubrid snake endemic to south India.

Description

Lycodon travancoricus is dark brown or black dorsally, with white crossbands and white lineolations on the sides. Ventrally it is uniform white. It is very similar to Lycodon striatus, but the upper lip is brown, or white spotted with brown.

The dorsal scales are smooth, in 17 rows. The ventrals number 175-202; the anal is entire; and the subcaudals are 56–76, usually double, but sometimes single.

Adults may attain 60 cm (23½ inches) in total length, with a tail 12.5 cm (4⅞ inches) long Maximum 742mm (29 in).

Geographic range
It is endemic to Peninsular India. It is a hill-dwelling species, preferring high-elevation wet forests. It occurs in the Western Ghats across Kerala, Tamil Nadu, Karnataka, Goa, southern Gujarat and southern parts of the Eastern Ghats in Tamil Nadu.  and also in the Maldives.

Populations from the Eastern Ghats and Deccan Plateau in Andhra Pradesh and Karnataka previously mistaken to be this species, have now been classified as a distinct species Lycodon deccanensis.

Habits and Habitat
It is a nocturnal, oviparous, non-venomous snake. It prefers forests, both evergreen and deciduous, on windward plains and hills.

References

Further reading
 Beddome, R. H. 1870 Descriptions of new reptiles from the Madras Presidency. Madras Monthly J. Med. Sci., 2: 169-176 [Reprint.: J. Soc. Bibliogr. Nat. Sci., London, 1 (10): 327–334, 1940]
 Chandramouli, S. R. and S. R. Ganesh 2010. Herpetofauna of southern Western Ghats, India – Reinvestigated after decades. Taprobanica 2 (2): 72-85 - get paper here
 Constable, JOHN D. 1949. Reptiles from the Indian Peninsula in the Museum of Comparative Zoology. Bull. Mus. Comp. Zool. Harvard 103: 59–160. - get paper here
 Ganesh SR, Amarasinghe AAT, Vogel G. 2020a. Redescription of Lycodon travancoricus (Beddome, 1870) (Reptilia: Colubridae), an Indian endemic snake, with a review of its geographic range. Taprobanica 9(1): 50–58.
 Ganesh, SR; Deuti, K; Punith, KG; Achyuthan, NS; Mallik, AK; Vogel, Gernot (2020). "A new species of Lycodon (Serpentes: Colubridae) from the Deccan Plateau of India, with notes on the range of Lycodon travancoricus (Beddome, 1870) and a revised key to peninsular Indian forms". Amphibian & Reptile Conservation. 17 (3): 74–84.
 Inger, Robert F.;Shaffer, H. Bradley;Koshy, Mammen;Bakde, Ramesh 1984. "A report on a collection of amphibians and reptiles from the Ponmudi, Kerala, South India." J. Bombay Nat. Hist. Soc. 81 (3): 551–570.
 Smith, M.A. 1943. The Fauna of British India, Ceylon and Burma, Including the Whole of the Indo-Chinese Sub-Region. Reptilia and Amphibia. 3 (Serpentes). Taylor and Francis, London. 583 pp.
 Wall, F. 1905. "Notes on Snakes collected in Cannanore from 5th November 1903 to 5th August 1904". J. Bombay Nat. Hist. Soc. 16: 292.
 Wall,F. 1919. "Notes on a collection of Snakes made in the Nilgiri Hills and the adjacent Wynaad." J. Bombay Nat. Hist. Soc. 26: 552–584.
 Whitaker, Romulus and Ashok Captain 2004. Snakes of India. Draco Books, 500 pp.

External links

travancoricus
Reptiles of India
Reptiles described in 1870